Kevin Anthony Tolar (born January 28, 1971) is a former Major League Baseball (MLB) pitcher. He played in parts of three seasons at the major league level for the Detroit Tigers and Boston Red Sox.

He was drafted by the Chicago White Sox in the 9th round of the 1989 amateur draft. Tolar played his first professional season with their Rookie league Gulf Coast League White Sox in 1989, and his last with the independent Atlantic League's Long Island Ducks in 2006. He played his last affiliated season in 2005 for the Triple-A affiliates of the Arizona Diamondbacks (Tucson Sidewinders) and the Toronto Blue Jays (Syracuse SkyChiefs).

After that, Tolar has played for the Aragua Tigers club of the Venezuelan Professional Baseball League (2006–2008), and the Long Island Ducks of the Atlantic League.

References

External links

1971 births
Living people
Detroit Tigers players
Boston Red Sox players
Major League Baseball pitchers
Baseball players from Florida
Nashville Sounds players
Canton-Akron Indians players
Long Island Ducks players
Gulf Coast White Sox players
Utica Blue Sox players
South Bend White Sox players
Salinas Spurs players
Sarasota White Sox players
Carolina Mudcats players
Lynchburg Hillcats players
Binghamton Mets players
St. Lucie Mets players
Indianapolis Indians players
Chattanooga Lookouts players
Toledo Mud Hens players
Jacksonville Suns players
Pawtucket Red Sox players
Iowa Cubs players
Tucson Sidewinders players
Syracuse SkyChiefs players
Chinatrust Whales players